ibml (Imaging Business Machines, L.L.C.), founded in 1992, is a privately held information capture company headquartered in  Irondale, Alabama, United States. Combining hardware and software products and services, ibml products provide end-to-end scanning and document capture.

History and technology 
Founded as a document scanning company on August 1, 1992, by Gary Murphy, ibml has grown into an information capture business that focuses on design, manufacture, delivery, and the support of high-speed document capture scanners and software. The ImageTrac scanner, a core product, was first shipped to Australian Airlines to read ticket numbers and capture color images of tickets for the airline revenue accounting process.  It became the scanner of choice for the airline industry soon thereafter.

In 1997, ibml released SoftTrac software to manage ImageTrac scanners.  The series continued to evolve; ImageTrac II was introduced in 2000, and ImageTrac III and ImageTrac IV were released in about 2003. In 2009, these scanners were selected for use by the 2010 United States Census. 2010 saw the introduction of the ImageTrac Series 5000 platform. This was followed by the launch of SoftTrac Capture Suite software in 2011, the ImageTracDS line of products in 2012, SoftTrac Synergetics intelligent document recognition software in 2013, and the ImageTrac Series 6000 in 2014. In 2020, the company unveiled the FADGI 3-Star Certified ibmlFUSiON™ high-speed intelligent scanner.

In June 2007, the majority of ibml was purchased by the private equity firm Ares Management. A minority is owned by management.  The board of directors consists of two individuals from Ares Management, one independent party, and ibml's CEO, Martin Birch.

References

Further reading 
 Business Insider article "ibml Unveils World's Fastest, Ultra-High-Volume, Intelligent Scanner: The ibml FUSiON, the Most Comprehensive Intelligent Information Capture Solution", February 10, 2020  
 RealWire news article "ibml appoints Donald C. Monistere as chief operating officer", June 13, 2019
 ECM Connection news article "ibml's ImageTrac Named High Volume Imaging Product Of The Year For Ninth Consecutive Year", November 5, 2015
 Zawya news article "Kodak Alaris Showcases Knowledge Share Initiative at GITEX 2014 as it Focuses Investment in the Middle East Region", September 17, 2014
 ISM news article "$6.5M home for family-run technology business IBML", May 1, 2005
 Document Boss article "Business Leader Interview with Derrick Murphy, CEO of ibml", September 30, 2013
  Document Imaging Report article "ibml's Software and Solutions Business Accelerating", October 1, 2014
  PR Newswire article "Clear Ballot and ibml Announce Partnership to Introduce Ultra High-Performance Ballot Scanning to Elections", July 13, 2016
 ECM Connection news article "ibml Wins UK 2016 Document Manager Product Of The Year Award", December 6, 2016

Software companies of the United States
Software companies established in 1992
Computer storage companies
1992 establishments in Alabama
2007 mergers and acquisitions